Terminal station (also referred to as Union Depot on some maps) was a temporary station serving the World's Columbian Exposition in Chicago, Illinois.

Gallery

References

External links

Railway stations in the United States opened in 1893
Railway stations closed in 1893
1893 establishments in Illinois
1893 disestablishments in the United States